Myrmica brevispinosa is a species of ant in the family Formicidae. They can be found in the U.S.A. and Canada.

References

Further reading

External links

 

Myrmica
Articles created by Qbugbot
Insects described in 1917